Benkiya Bale is a 1983 Indian Kannada-language film, directed by the Dorai–Bhagavan duo. It is based on the novel of the same name by T. R. Subba Rao. The film stars Anant Nag, Lakshmi, K. S. Ashwath and Thoogudeepa Srinivas.

Cast 
 Anant Nag Narasimha Murthy
 Lakshmi Rukku/Rukmini
 K. S. Ashwath
 Vajramuni
 Balakrishna
 Dinesh
 Thoogudeepa Srinivas
 Musuri Krishnamurthy
 Mysore Lokesh
 Mandeep Roy

Soundtrack 
The music was composed by Rajan–Nagendra, with lyrics by Chi. Udaya Shankar. All the songs composed for the film were received extremely well and considered evergreen songs.

References

External links 
 

1983 films
Indian drama films
1980s Kannada-language films
Films scored by Rajan–Nagendra
Films based on Indian novels
Films directed by Dorai–Bhagavan